The Tree of Life Award is the highest humanitarian award the Jewish National Fund presents to one individual or family each year in appreciation of their outstanding community involvement, their dedication to the cause of American-Israeli friendship, and their devotion to peace and the security of human life. The award recognizes leaders of achievements and innovations in industry, government and education. Past awardees have included individuals who have made diverse contributions from Isaac Stern, to Arthur G. Cohen, Donald Trump and Susan Polgar. Past
presenters of the award have included Margaret Thatcher and Shimon Peres.

Recipients 
 John W. Barfield (Founder The Bartech Group, Inc.; author; philanthropist)
 Ron & Daron Barness
 Sid & Alicia Belzberg
 Raymond Brown & Wanda Akin Brown
 Ben Carson
 Chris Christie, governor
 Arthur G. Cohen 
 Bonnie Comley
 William Cunningham (President of the University of Texas)
 Paul Dresselhaus (1999)
 Elizabsth H. Dole
 Richard Egan
 Tovah Feldshuh
 Carly Fiorina, former CEO and presidential candidate
 Ohio Lt. Governor Lee Fisher
 Steven Goodstein
 Former Vice President Al Gore
 Dr. John C. Hitt
 Kathy Ireland
 New York Congressman Steve Israel
 N. Richard Kalikow
 John Adam Kanas
 Gary L. Krupp (2001) (Founder Pave the Way Foundation, Inc)
 Stewart F. Lane
 Jeffrey E. Levine
 M. David Low (President of UT-Houston)
 William C. McCahill 
 M. Peter McPherson
 Akron Mayor Don Plusquellic
 Jana Robbins
 Stephen M. Ross
 Susan Polgar
 Secretary of State Colin Powell
 Jana Robbins
 Stephen M. Ross
 Roy J. Saunders
 Henry Segerstrom – presented in 1995 by Margaret Thatcher
 Fred & Shari Schenk
 Isaac Stern 
 Donald Trump
 Jerry Zaks 
 Mort Zuckerman

External links
 Official Website

References

 Real Estate Weekly article
 Jewish National Fund press release
 Jewish News article
 Jewish National Fund article
 15 Minutes Magazine article

Israeli awards